Fanger is a surname. Notable people with the surname include:

 Daniel Fanger (born 1988), Swiss footballer
 Élisabeth Fanger (born 1956), French author
 Povl Ole Fanger (1934–2006), Danish academic and engineer

See also
 Fenger
 Ranger (surname)